Antoine "Tony" Porcel (17 December 1937 – 22 March 2014) was a French boxer. He competed in the 1960 Summer Olympics, where he was disqualified in his third bout against Sergei Sivko. In 1963 he turned professional and retired in 1973 with a record of 26 wins (11 by knockout), 25 losses and 10 draws. He was the French bantamweight champion in 1966–67 and 1970–71, and lost a 1966 match for the European flyweight title to René Libeer. He later became a boxing trainer, and died from Alzheimer's disease at the age 76.

1960 Olympic results
Below is the record of Antoine Porcel, a French flyweight boxer who competed at the 1960 Rome Olympics:

 Round of 32: defeated Ralph Knoesen (South Africa) by decision, 5-0
 Round of 16: lost to Sergey Sivko (Soviet Union) dy disqualification in the third round

References

1937 births
2014 deaths
Sportspeople from Oran
Boxers at the 1960 Summer Olympics
Olympic boxers of France
French male boxers
Pieds-Noirs
Bantamweight boxers
Deaths from Alzheimer's disease